Pseudopodocotyle is a genus of trematodes in the family Opecoelidae. It consists of one species, Pseudopodocotyle bravoae Caballero Rodríguez, 1970.

References

Opecoelidae
Plagiorchiida genera